Dobson's Mill was a working tower windmill for grinding wheat and corn.  It stands in the High Street in the town of Burgh le Marsh, near Skegness in Lincolnshire, England. The mill was, prior to damage by Storm Ciara on 9 February 2020, open to the public as a tourist attraction and is a Grade I listed building. The mill site also houses the Burgh-le-Marsh Heritage Centre. 

The windmill was built and fitted out by Sam Oxley, an Alford millwright, in the early 1800s for the Jessop family, who baked bread on the same site. It was completed by 1844. Dobson was the name of the last miller.

The mill is built in five storeys of tarred brick and was fitted with five sails, unusual in that they turned clockwise, driving three sets of millstones (two pairs of grey stones and one pair of French) in an anti-clockwise direction. There is a blocked opening on the ground floor where a steam traction engine once powered an extra set of millstones.

The mill was purchased by the local Council in the 1960s and refurbished, including the installation of a new cap and sails, in 2014.

On 9 February 2020 the cap and sails were destroyed by winds from Storm Ciara.

See also
List of windmills in Lincolnshire

References

External links
Burgh-le-Marsh Heritage Centre
Burgh-le-Marsh Windmill History

Windmills in Lincolnshire
Tower mills in the United Kingdom
Grinding mills in the United Kingdom
Windmills completed in 1844
Towers completed in 1844
Windmills
Grade I listed buildings in Lincolnshire
Grade I listed windmills
Burgh le Marsh